The Cornish Way is a cycle route which is part of the National Cycle Network that links Bude to Land's End. The route is via Padstow or St Austell and is 180 miles in length.

Trails

The First and Last Trail
From Land's End to Hayle 

The Engine House Trail
Part of the Mineral Tramway Trails from Hayle to Truro

The Coast and Clay Trail
Truro to Bodmin via St Austell

The North Cornwall Trail
Bodmin to county boundary near Bude

The St Piran Trail
Truro to Padstow via Newquay

The Camel Trail

This offroad section leads from Padstow to Bodmin.

See also

 Mineral Tramway Trails - the mineral tramways trails are a series of trails located in mid west Cornwall.
 Clay Trails - cycleway near St Austell and the Eden Project
 Sustrans - a charity promoting sustainable transport in the UK

References

External links
Cornwall County Council pages
Sustrans
National Cycle Network
Map: National Cycle Network 2008
Alternative National Cycle Network map (using OpenStreetMap data)

Cycleways in Cornwall